Buti Alpheuse Khoza (born 21 May 1988) is a South African professional footballer who plays as a goalkeeper for Jomo Cosmos.

Club career

Jomo Cosmos
Khoza made his debut for Jomo Cosmos on 13 September 2011 against AmaZulu at Makhulong Stadium. He was substituted off only five minutes into the match for Namibian goalkeeper Abisai Shanangayamwe. His only other appearance in the campaign came against Santos, in an away match which Cosmos would lose 1–0.

Cosmos were relegated at the end of the 2011–12 campaign, and Khoza would make eight appearances in their first season in the National First Division. He managed only a single clean sheet in his second season with the club, spending most of the season as an unused substitute. During the following two seasons Khoza only made seven more league appearances, before being released at the end of the 2014–15 season as Cosmos secured promotion to the Premier Soccer League.

Witbank Spurs
Khoza joined his hometown club Witbank Spurs at the start of the 2016–17 season, after spending a full season without a club. He made his debut for the club on 1 October 2016, conceding twice as Spurs lost to Royal Eagles. In his third and final match for the club, away against provincial rivals Mbombela United, Khoza gave away a penalty after bringing down Bongani Ndhlovu in the penalty area in the 28th minute. Spurs went on to lose the match 5–1.

Ubuntu Cape Town
Khoza signed for Ubuntu Cape Town halfway through the 2016–17 season, having only made four total appearances for Spurs. Immediately made the first choice goalkeeper, he debuted on 11 February 2017 against Real Kings at Sugar Ray Xulu Stadium, keeping the first of his seven clean sheets for the season.

Return to Jomo Cosmos
Khoza returned to Jomo Cosmos on 1 July 2019. His debut came on 15 September 2019 in a home match against Real Kings at Dobsonville Stadium.

Career statistics

Club

References

Living people
1988 births
People from Emalahleni Local Municipality, Mpumalanga
Jomo Cosmos F.C. players
Witbank Spurs F.C.
Ubuntu Cape Town F.C. players
Association football goalkeepers
South African soccer players